"No Drug Like Me" is a song by Canadian singer Carly Rae Jepsen. It was first released as a double A-side single with "Now That I Found You" on February 27, 2019 by 604, School Boy and Interscope Records, to promote Jepsen's then-forthcoming fourth studio album, Dedicated. In June 2019, a remix of the song by Mansionair received an individual release as a promotional single. "No Drug Like Me" was inspired by a new love that Jepsen was experiencing at the time.

Background
"No Drug Like Me" is an 1980s-influenced synth-pop ballad. It has been described as "nocturnal", "low-key", "darker and more viscous" than the rest of Jepsen's repertoire. It was written in the late evening of a recording session and according to Jepsen, it "came up very easily". Lyrically, the song was inspired by Jepsen's love for James Flannigan, who she co-wrote the song with, alongside John Hill, Jordan Palmer, and Daniel Ledinsky. It was produced by Hill and Palmer. The song is about making a commitment at the beginning of a relationship and the promise to open up if the partner turns out the right one. The lyrics equate being in love with Jepsen to drug intoxication. The singer explained that the song "is a promise I made to love in general. That when the good stuff lands my way I'll always try to be vulnerable and brave and show all of myself".

"No Drug Like Me" was released alongside "Now That I Found You" as a double A-side on February 27, 2019. Jepsen decided to release the two very different songs at the same time to demonstrate a spectrum of her new album, Dedicated. On June 28, Jepsen released a Mansionair remix of "No Drug Like Me" to coincide with the launch of the North American leg of The Dedicated Tour.

Critical reception
Music critics Heather Phares of AllMusic  highlighted "No Drug Like Me" as one of the best songs on Dedicated.

Year-end lists

Track listing
 Digital download/Streaming
 "No Drug Like Me" (Mansionair Remix) – 3:38

References

2019 songs
Carly Rae Jepsen songs
Songs written by Carly Rae Jepsen
Songs written by James Flannigan (songwriter)
Songs written by John Hill (record producer)
604 Records singles
Schoolboy Records singles
Interscope Records singles
Synth-pop ballads